Union Sekailwe (born 6 January 1986) is a Paralympian athlete from South Africa competing mainly in category T38 sprint events. Sekailwe competed for his country at the 2012 Summer Paralympics in London, where he won a bronze medal in the 400 metre sprint. Sekailwe has competed at World Championship level on two occasions, picking up three medals. He has also competed in long jump at the Paralympics, and in the javelin throw at the World Championships.

Notes

Paralympic athletes of South Africa
Athletes (track and field) at the 2012 Summer Paralympics
Paralympic bronze medalists for South Africa
1986 births
Living people
South African male sprinters
South African male long jumpers
South African male javelin throwers
Medalists at the 2012 Summer Paralympics
Athletes (track and field) at the 2016 Summer Paralympics
Paralympic medalists in athletics (track and field)
20th-century South African people
21st-century South African people